Paul Allen (born January 6, 1966) is a sports commentator who has called play-by-play for the Minnesota Vikings since 2002.  He is the voice of the Minnesota Vikings Radio Network and for horse racing at Canterbury Park. Allen has worked for Twin Cities radio station KFAN, where he currently hosts a morning sports radio show, since 1998.

Biography 

Allen previously called horse races at different locations throughout the United States until he came to Canterbury Park in Shakopee, Minnesota in 1995. Allen was both criticized and praised by Viking fans for "ripping" into Brett Favre after he threw an interception in the 2009 NFC Championship game that ultimately kept them out of the Super Bowl. He uses personally coined phrases like "Minnesota Moving Company" (offensive line) and "Minneapolis Miracle," the play where the Vikings beat the Saints with a last play touchdown in the playoffs on January 14, 2018. Allen is known for his emotional calls, such as the aforementioned 2009 NFC Championship, the 2003 Vikings vs Cardinals Regular Season Finale, and the 2015 Wildcard Playoff game between the Vikings and the Seahawks.

Allen is a devout Christian and does a podcast called Faith and Goal. He also speaks at churches and leads chapels every summer at the Dean Kutz Memorial Chapel on the property of Canterbury Park.

References

External links
 The Paul Allen Project - KFAN

Living people
American sports announcers
National Football League announcers
Minnesota Vikings announcers
People from Shakopee, Minnesota
1966 births